Edward Pearson may refer to:

 Edward Pearson (theologian) (1756–1811), English academic and theologian, Master of Sidney Sussex College, Cambridge
 Edward J. Pearson (1863–1928), president of the New York, New Haven and Hartford Railroad
 Edward Nathan Pearson (1859–1924), New Hampshire Secretary of State
 Edward W. Pearson Sr. (1872–1946),  African American entrepreneur
 Edward Pearson (soccer), member of the National Soccer Hall of Fame

See also